Althaus is a surname. Notable people with the surname include:

Dieter Althaus (born 1958), German politician, Minister-President of Thuringia
Johannes Althusius (1557–1638), also known as Johannes Althaus, German Calvinist philosopher and theologian
Marcella Althaus-Reid, Argentinian professor
Adolf Paul Johannes Althaus, theologian
Kenneth Althaus, U.S. Army, general during World War II
Ernst Freiherr von Althaus, one of the world's first flying aces
Urs Althaus, Swiss actor